Rachel Fenton may refer to:

 Rae Joyce, the pen name of Rachel Fenton (born 1976), graphic novel artist and author from New Zealand, born in the UK
 Rachel Fenton (Love Island), a TV personality on season two of the reality show Love Island